Bondoola is a rural locality in the Livingstone Shire, Queensland, Australia.

Road infrastructure
The Rockhampton-Yeppoon Road (as Yeppoon Road) runs through from south-west to north-east.

References 

Shire of Livingstone
Localities in Queensland